The  was a class of amphibious assault ships of the Imperial Japanese Navy (IJN), serving during and after World War II. The IJN also called them .

Background
The IJN lost too many destroyers while employed as transporters ("Tokyo Express") in the Guadalcanal Campaign. Therefore, the IJN wanted a transporter which could penetrate the front line. It was realized rapidly after Operation Ke.

Design
In April 1943, the General Staff requested a high-speed military transporter to the Technical Department. The requirements were as follows:
Displacement:  standard
Propulsion: 1 × geared turbine, 2 × boilers, single shaft
Speed: 
Range:  at 
Capacity: 2 × Landing craft (Daihatsu) and 200 tons freight
Armament: 2 ×  or  AA guns, 9 × 25 mm AA guns and 36 × depth charges

In this original plan, the requirement for a slope was not considered. They thought about a Japanese version of the High speed transport (APD).
The Technical Department, however, did not agree with this plan. They submitted a more aggressive plan to the General Staff. They increased the number of landing craft carried and with the effect of reducing the time for landing operations.
In addition, about the mass production effect, they intended to deal with this by reducing the shipyards being used for production.
At that time, the stern slope and operating ability of the amphibious tanks were added.
In September 1943, the Kure Naval Arsenal finished the detailed design. Her project number was J37.

Construction
The IJN nominated Kure Naval Arsenal as the main builder and Mitsubishi Heavy Industries as support builder.

Lead ship (Landing ship No.1) was constructed at Mitsubishi, laid down on 5 November 1943, launched on 8 February 1944, and completed on 10 May 1944.
The Kure Naval Arsenal completed 15 vessels, Mitsubishi completed 6 vessels.
The Kure Naval Arsenal was earnest. They made the original sized wooden samples, and learned a work procedure. They used the 's dock and repeated build 2 vessels at the same time. Therefore, most of Kure's vessels were completed within 80 days from being laid down.
The completed vessels were sent one by one to the front.

Service
Their primary role was that of a transporter, however since their armaments were strong they were useful as multi-purpose ships at the front, functioning as transporters, as minelayers and as escort ships.
Most of these vessels were sent to the Battle of Leyte and transportation duty of the Bonin Islands. By that time, the IJN already lost air superiority and thalassocracy (naval superiority) in those areas and these vessels suffered heavy losses.
5 vessels survived war and were surrendered to the Allies.

Ships in class

Photos

See also
 High speed transport
 No.1-class patrol boat

References

Bibliography
 , History of Pacific War Vol.37, "Support vessels of the Imperial Japanese Forces", Gakken (Japan), June 2002, 
 Rekishi Gunzō, History of Pacific War Vol.51, "The truth histories of the Imperial Japanese Vessels Part.2", Gakken (Japan), August 2005, 
 The Maru Special, Japanese Naval Vessels No.50, "Japanese minesweepers and landing ships", Ushio Shobō (Japan), April 1981
 Ships of the World special issue Vol.47, Auxiliary Vessels of the Imperial Japanese Navy, (Japan), March 1997
 Senshi Sōsho Vol.88, Naval armaments and war preparation (2), "And after the outbreak of war", Asagumo Simbun (Japan), October 1975
 Shizuo Fukui, FUKUI SHIZUO COLLECTION "Japanese Naval Vessels 1869–1945", KK Bestsellers (Japan), December 1994

Landing craft
World War II naval ships of Japan